Sodium/hydrogen exchanger 11, also known as solute carrier family 9, member 11, is a protein that in humans is encoded by the SLC9A11 gene. SLC9A11 is a member of the sodium-hydrogen exchanger (NHE) family.

References

Solute carrier family